Stan Hixon (born July 24, 1957) is an American football coach and former player. Hixon was most recently the wide receivers coach at Temple.

Playing career

Hixon played four years at Iowa State and accrued career numbers of 46 catches for 776 yards.

Coaching career

Following his graduation, Hixon served as an assistant coach at Morehead State, Appalachian State, South Carolina, Wake Forest, Georgia Tech and LSU before coaching leaving the college ranks for the NFL.

Hixon was the wide receivers coach for the Washington Redskins of the National Football League (NFL) for six years, until January 2010, when his contract was not renewed after the Redskins hired new head coach Mike Shanahan.

Following his departure from Washington, Hixon served as the wide receiver coach under Chan Gailey for the Buffalo Bills from 2010 through 2012.

From 2012 through 2013, Hixon was the assistant head coach and wide receivers coach under Bill O'Brien at Penn State. Hixon then moved to Houston to be the Texans wide receivers coach in 2014, after O'Brien was hired to be the head coach of the Texans.

In March 2017, Hixon joined Geoff Collins' staff at Temple.

References

External links
 Penn State Nittany Lions bio
 

1957 births
Living people
American football wide receivers
Appalachian State Mountaineers football coaches
Georgia Tech Yellow Jackets football coaches
Iowa State Cyclones football players
LSU Tigers football coaches
Morehead State Eagles football coaches
Richmond Spiders football coaches
Penn State Nittany Lions football coaches
South Carolina Gamecocks football coaches
Wake Forest Demon Deacons football coaches
Washington Redskins coaches
Morehead State University alumni
Sportspeople from Lakeland, Florida